Lustiger is a surname. Notable people with the surname include:

 Arno Lustiger (1924–2012), German historian and author of Jewish origin
  (born 1963), German author
 Jean-Marie Lustiger (1926–2007), French cardinal of the Roman Catholic Church